Kuwanaspis is a genus of scale insects belonging to the family Diaspididae. They feed on bamboo.

Species
Species include:
 Kuwanaspis annandalei (Green, 1919) as Chionaspis annandalei
 Kuwanaspis arundinariae Takahashi, 1938
 Kuwanaspis bambusae Kuwana, 1902 as Leucaspis bambusae
 Kuwanaspis bambusicola (Cockerell, 1899) as Mytilaspis bambusicola, junior synonym Chuaspis shuichuensis  
 Kuwanaspis bambusifoliae Takahashi, 1934 as Tsukushiaspis bambusifoliae
 Kuwanaspis daliensis 
 Kuwanaspis elongata 
 Kuwanaspis elongatoides 
 Kuwanaspis foliosa Wu, 1986 as Kuwanaspis foliosus 
 Kuwanaspis hikosani 
 Kuwanaspis howardi (woolly bamboo scale) 
 Kuwanaspis linearis (bamboo long scale) 
 Kuwanaspis multipora 
 Kuwanaspis neolinearis 
 Kuwanaspis pectinata 
 Kuwanaspis phragmitis 
 Kuwanaspis phyllostachydis 
 Kuwanaspis pseudoleucaspis (bamboo diaspidid) 
 Kuwanaspis suishana
 Kuwanaspis takahashii 
 Kuwanaspis tanzawensis 
 Kuwanaspis vermiformis (Takahashi, 1931) as Tsukushiaspis vermiformis

References

Sternorrhyncha genera
Diaspidini